The Corowa Chronicle was an English language newspaper published in Corowa, New South Wales, Australia from 1905 to 1928.

History
The paper began on 7 October 1905 and was published by Albert John Esau until it ceased as a paper in its own right in 1928, when it was absorbed by The Corowa Free Press. The paper circulated throughout the Murray district of New South Wales and the north-eastern district of Victoria.

Digitisation
The various versions of the paper have been digitised as part of the Australian Newspapers Digitisation Program project hosted by the National Library of Australia.

See also
 List of newspapers in New South Wales
 List of newspapers in Australia

References

External links

Bibliography
Country conscience : a history of the New South Wales provincial press, 1841-1995 / by Rod Kirkpatrick, Canberra City, A.C.T. : Infinite Harvest Publishing, 2000
Looking good : the changing appearance of Australian newspapers / by Victor Isaacs, for the Australian Newspapers History Group, Middle Park, Qld. : Australian Newspaper History Group, 2007. 
Press timeline : Select chronology of significant Australian press events to 2011 / Compiled by Rod Kirkpatrick for the Australian Newspaper History Group 
Australian Newspaper History : A Bibliography / Compiled by Victor Isaacs, Rod Kirkpatrick and John Russell, Middle Park, Qld. : Australian Newspaper History Group, 2004.
Newspapers in Australian libraries : a union list. 4th ed.

Defunct newspapers published in New South Wales
Newspapers on Trove